= Zobrachoidae =

Scientific classification
- Domain: Eukaryota
- Kingdom: Animalia
- Phylum: Arthropoda
- Class: Malacostraca
- Order: Amphipoda
- Superfamily: Haustorioidea
- Family: Zobrachoidae

Family of crustaceans

Zobrachoidae is a family of crustaceans belonging to the order Amphipoda.

Genera:

- Bumeralius Barnard & Drummond, 1982
- Chono Clark & Barnard, 1987
- Prantinus Barnard & Drummond, 1982
- Tonocote Clark & Barnard, 1986
- Zobracho Barnard, 1961
